Guglielmi may refer to
Guglielmi (surname)
Guglielmi castle in Italy
Guglielmi detachable coil, a medical device used in the treatment of brain aneurysms
Beebea guglielmi, a moth